The 2020 Lucas Oil 200 Driven by General Tire was the first stock car race of the 2020 ARCA Menards Series and the 57th iteration of the event. The race was held on Saturday, February 8, 2020, in Daytona Beach, Florida at Daytona International Speedway, a 2.5 miles (4.0 km) permanent triangular-shaped superspeedway. The race took the scheduled 80 laps to complete. At race's end, Michael Self of Venturini Motorsports would dominate and hold off the field to win his eighth career ARCA Menards Series win and his first of the season. To fill out the podium, Hailie Deegan of DGR-Crosley and Drew Dollar of Venturini Motorsports would finish second and third, respectively.

Background 

Daytona International Speedway is one of three superspeedways to hold NASCAR races, the other two being Indianapolis Motor Speedway and Talladega Superspeedway. The standard track at Daytona International Speedway is a four-turn superspeedway that is 2.5 miles (4.0 km) long. The track's turns are banked at 31 degrees, while the front stretch, the location of the finish line, is banked at 18 degrees.

Entry list 

*Withdrew.

Practice

First practice 
The first one-hour session would take place on February 7.

Second practice 
The second and final one-hour session would take place on February 7.

Qualifying 
Qualifying was held on February 8. Each driver was split into six groups, and each group would run four minute sessions.

Full qualifying results

Race results

References 

2020 ARCA Menards Series
NASCAR races at Daytona International Speedway
February 2020 sports events in the United States
2020 in sports in Florida